High-sticking is the name of two infractions in the sport of ice hockey. It is also the name of a minor penalty called in the sport of ringette. This article deals chiefly with situations involving the sport of ice hockey. 

High-sticking may occur when a player intentionally or inadvertently plays the puck with his stick above the height of the shoulders or above the cross bar of a hockey goal. This can result in a penalty or a stoppage of play. In the rules of the National Hockey League, high-sticking is defined as a penalty in Rule 60 and as a non-penalty foul in Rule 80.

A penalty is assessed if a player strikes another player with a high stick.  The player is given a minor penalty unless his high stick caused an injury, in which case the referee has the option to assess a double-minor, major, game misconduct or match penalty. It is the referee's discretion which penalty to assess: the rule calls for a double minor for an accidental injury, or a match penalty for a deliberate attempt to injure (whether the opposition player was actually injured). Injury is usually decided by the high stick causing bleeding, but the presence of blood does not automatically mean an extra penalty is awarded. Some referees have been known to award an extra penalty without the presence of blood if the referee determines that the injury sustained was sufficient to warrant a double-minor penalty.
A stoppage in play results if a high stick comes in contact with the puck and the team who touched it regains control of the puck.  However, play usually continues if a player touches the puck with a high stick and the opposing team gains control of the puck. If the puck goes into the opposing net after coming into contact with a high stick, the goal is disallowed.  The level at which a stick is considered too high for a goal is the crossbar of the net.  However, if a player knocks the puck into his own net with a high stick, the goal is allowed.

References

Ice hockey penalties
Ice hockey terminology
Banned sports tactics
Violence in ice hockey

fr:Crosse haute (hockey sur glace)